Dirk Brouwer (September 1, 1902 – January 31, 1966) was a Dutch-American astronomer.

He received his PhD in 1927 at Leiden University under Willem de Sitter  and then went to Yale University.  From 1941 until 1966 he was editor of the Astronomical Journal.

He specialized in celestial mechanics and together with Gerald Clemence wrote the textbook Methods of Celestial Mechanics.

Awards 
Gold Medal of the Royal Astronomical Society (1955) 
Bruce Medal (1966)

Named after him 
Asteroid 1746 Brouwer
The crater Brouwer on the Moon (jointly with mathematician Luitzen Egbertus Jan Brouwer)
Dirk Brouwer Award of the Division on Dynamical Astronomy of the American Astronomical Society
Dirk Brouwer Award of the American Astronautical Society

References

External links
 Bruce Medal page
 Awarding of Bruce medal
 Awarding of RAS gold medal
National Academy of Sciences Biographical Memoir

Obituaries
 AJ 71 (1966) 76 (one paragraph)
 Obs 86 (1966) 92 (one line)
 PASP 78 (1966) 104 (one line, see also )
 QJRAS 8 (1967) 84

1902 births
1966 deaths
20th-century American astronomers
20th-century Dutch astronomers
Dutch emigrants to the United States
Leiden University alumni
Members of the United States National Academy of Sciences
Scientists from Rotterdam
Recipients of the Gold Medal of the Royal Astronomical Society
Yale University faculty
The Astronomical Journal editors